Central African Republic–United States relations are the international relations between Central African Republic and the United States of America. The relations have generally been positive, although concerns over the pace of political and economic liberalization and human rights have affected the degree of support provided by the United States to the Central African Republic.

History 
The United States and the Central African Republic established diplomatic relations on August 13th, 1960.

The U.S. Embassy in Bangui was briefly closed as a result of the 1996-97 mutinies. It reopened in 1998 with limited staff, but U.S. Agency for International Development (USAID) and Peace Corps missions previously operating in Bangui did not return. The American Embassy in Bangui again temporarily suspended operations on November 2, 2002 in response to security concerns raised by the October 2002 launch of François Bozizé's 2003 military coup.

The Embassy reopened in January 2005; however, there currently is limited U.S. diplomatic/consular representation in the C.A.R. As a result, the ability of the Embassy to provide services to American citizens remains extremely limited. The Department of State approved the lifting of Section 508 aid restrictions triggered by the coup; U.S. assistance to the Central African Republic had been prohibited except in the areas of humanitarian aid and support for democratization.

On December 27, 2012, the US closed its embassy in the Central African Republic and removed its diplomats due to rising violence from the rebellion in the country.

Principal Officials 
 Ambassador, U.S. Embassy Bangui
 Ambassador, Central African Republic Embassy Washington, D.C.--Emmanuel Touaboy

Diplomatic missions 
The U.S. Embassy is located in Bangui.

Gallery

References

External links
History of Central African Republic - U.S. relations

 
Bilateral relations of the United States
United States